You're Dead is a 1999 British dark comedy crime film directed by Andy Hurst. Although set in London most of the film was in fact filmed in Germany, and the film was released in German dub as You Are Dead, and in Japan as King of UK. The plot concerns a disastrously fatal bank robbery set up by a gangster's son played by Rhys Ifans, while the emotional centre of the film is built on the relationship between the accomplice in the robbery, a veteran safe-breaker played by John Hurt, and his policewoman daughter.

References

External links
https://www.imdb.com/title/tt0178997/

1999 films
British black comedy films
German black comedy films
English-language German films
1990s English-language films
Films directed by Andy Hurst
1990s British films
1990s German films